Samuel Frederick Nixon (December 8, 1860 Westfield, Chautauqua County, New York - October 10, 1905 Westfield, Chautauqua County, New York) was an American businessman and politician.

Life
He was educated at Westfield High School and graduated from Hamilton College in 1881.

He had interests in railroad companies, and operated a marble and granite works, a box factory and various other enterprises in and around Westfield.

In 1884, he was elected Trustee of the Village of Westfield. In 1886, he was elected Supervisor of the Town of Westfield. Later he was elected Chairman of the Chautauqua County Board of Supervisors for 14 annual terms.

He was a member of the New York State Assembly (Chautauqua Co., 1st D.) in 1888, 1889, 1890.

He was again a member of the State Assembly in 1894, 1895 (both Chautauqua Co.), 1896, 1897, 1898, 1899, 1900, 1901, 1902, 1903, 1904 and 1905 (all ten Chautauqua Co., 2nd D.); and was Speaker from 1899 to 1905. He was a delegate to the Republican National Convention in 1904.

In the summer of 1905, he travelled to visit the Lewis and Clark Centennial Exposition in Portland, Oregon, but returned already ill. A few weeks later he developed "blood poisoning" and underwent two operations, but died shortly thereafter.  His home, the Nixon Homestead, was listed on the National Register of Historic Places in 1983.

Sources

References

1860 births
1905 deaths
People from Westfield, New York
Speakers of the New York State Assembly
Republican Party members of the New York State Assembly
Hamilton College (New York) alumni
19th-century American politicians
20th-century American politicians
Town supervisors in New York (state)